Johan Eberhard von Schantz (29 October 1802 – 3 January 1880) was a Finnish-born admiral in the Russian Imperial Navy, ship designer and explorer.

Life 
Schantz was born in the Western Finnish coastal town of Pori, which at the time was a part of Sweden, the son of the lieutenant general Johan Eberhard von Schantz and Johanna Sofia Didron. In 1814 he enlisted the Russian merchant navy and later took chief mate classes in Vyborg. Schantz served 1821–1828 as a midshipman in the 26th naval equipage of the Baltic Fleet, 1828–1830 as a lieutenant in the 8th naval equipage, 1830–1832 in the 27th naval equipage and 1832 in the 5th naval equipage. During the Russo-Turkish War (1828–29), Schantz served in the ship of the line Fère Champenoise which took part of the blockade of the Dardanelles. In 1833–1838, he was the adjutant of the admiral Alexander Sergeyevich Menshikov.

In 1834–1836, Schantz circumnavigated the globe as the commander of the Russian Imperial Navy ship America. In 1835 he rediscovered the Wotho Atoll, originally discovered by the Spanish expedition of Ruy López de Villalobos in the 1540s. The atoll was later also known as the Schantz Islands.

In 1841, Schantz sailed the frigate Kamchatka from New York City to Kronstadt and commanded the ship until 1847. He was promoted to counter admiral in 1848. In the 1850s Schantz designed several gunboats built in the Finnish docks of Pori, Turku and Helsinki. He also designed the frigate Rurik (1851) and the corvette Kalevala (1858), both built at the Turku Old Shipyard. During the Crimean War, Schantz served in the Baltic Fleet. He was promoted to vice admiral in 1855 and admiral in 1866. Schantz was a member of the Russian Board of Admiralty from February 1863 to his death.

Schantz published his Swedish language memoirs under the pen name En gammal sjöman (An Old Sailor) in 1870–1871.

Decorations 
1846:  Order of St Vladimir 3rd degree
1847:  Order of St. George 4th degree
1854:  Order of Saint Stanislaus 1st degree
1858:  Order of St. Anne 1st degree
1864:  Order of St Vladimir 2nd degree
1868:  Order of the White Eagle
1871:  Order of St. Alexander Nevsky
1876:  Order of St. Alexander Nevsky, with diamonds

Bibliography 
Mitt första steg på sjömannabanan, G. W. Wilén & Co, Turku, 1870.
Mina första steg på örlogsmannabanan, G. W. Wilén & Co, Turku, 1871.

Sources 
von Schantz, Johan Eberhard Finnish Literature Society

References 

1802 births
1880 deaths
People from Pori
Swedish-speaking Finns
Imperial Russian Navy admirals
Russian military personnel of the Crimean War
Engineers from the Russian Empire
Explorers from the Russian Empire
Russian explorers of the Pacific
Circumnavigators of the globe
Recipients of the Order of St. Anna, 1st class
Recipients of the Order of St. Vladimir, 3rd class
Recipients of the Order of St. Vladimir, 2nd class
Recipients of the Order of the White Eagle (Russia)
Finnish people from the Russian Empire